Peter Woodward (died May 9, 1685) represented Dedham, Massachusetts in the Great and General Court in 1665, 1669, and 1670. He also served on the board of selectmen for 16 years, with his first term beginning in 1643 and his last ending in 1670.

His daughter, Ann, married Robert Hinsdale, probably in England. He had at least two sons, William and Peter. William, a Harvard College graduate, was hired to assist John Allin in preaching at the First Church and Parish in Dedham in 1668, but died the following June. His brother collected his salary from the church 16 years later.

He died May 9, 1685.

The Town gathered on January 4, 1669, to elect selectmen for the year. At the end of the meeting, Woodward was declared one of the winners. Many supporters of Anthony Fisher alleged fraud, however, and Woodward refused to serve until the question was resolved. The Town met again on January 8, and this time voted by secret ballot. Fisher was elected.

References

Works cited
 

Dedham, Massachusetts selectmen
Members of the colonial Massachusetts General Court from Dedham
1685 deaths
Year of birth missing
Signers of the Dedham Covenant